Kill It and Leave This Town is a 2020 Polish adult animated psychological horror film created by Polish animator Mariusz Wilczyński, in his feature film debut, from a script developed alongside Agnieszka Ścibior. The film concerns a hero, fleeing from despair after losing those dearest to him, who hides in a safe land of memories, where time stands still and all those dear to him are alive.

Voice cast 
Krystyna Janda as Janek's mother
Andrzej Chyra as Janek's father
Maja Ostaszewska as Janek
Barbara Krafftówna as Mariusz's mother (old)
Anna Dymna as Mariusz's mother (young)
Gustaw Holoubek as Mariusz's alter ego

Production 
The film took fourteen years to animate. Wilczyński had originally intended Kill It and Leave This Town to be a short film, however eventually ended up deciding to make it his feature debut. The film was made for Wilczyński to symbolically say goodbye to his family who had died. At the film's premiere at the 70th Berlin International Film Festival, Wilczyński said "In a short time, people who were important to me passed away. I did not have time to say goodbye to them, I do it with my animation." He also added; "I don't believe in death, they didn't die, but they live in my imagination."

Release 
The film premiered at the 70th Berlin International Film Festival on 22 February 2020, and was delayed from theatrical releases due to the impact of the COVID-19 pandemic on cinema. It was released in theatres in Poland on 5 March 2021, and grossed $183,771.

The film received generally positive reviews from critics, and received several accolades. On Metacritic, the film has a score of 69 out of 100 based on 8 critics, indicating "generally favorable reviews".

Accolades

References

External links  
Kill It and Leave This Town at the filmpolski.pl

2020 films
2020 horror films
Animated feature films
Polish independent films
Polish animated films
2020 animated films
Polish horror films
2020 psychological thriller films
Adult animated films
Animated thriller films
Animated horror films
Films about death